Edward Gould may refer to:

 Edward Gould (golfer) (1874-1937), American golfer
 Edward Wyatt Gould (1879–1960), Welsh rugby union player and Olympic athlete
 Edward Blencowe Gould (1847–1916), British Consul in Bangkok, Thailand
 Edward Sherman Gould (1808–1885), United States author and critic
 Edd Gould (1988–2012), British animator

See also
Eddie Gould, character in Underbelly: The Golden Mile